Bremen-Hemelingen is a railway station located in Bremen, Germany. The station is located in Hemelingen on the Wanne-Eickel–Hamburg railway and the train services are operated by NordWestBahn. The station has been part of the Bremen S-Bahn since December 2010.

Train services
The station is served by the following services:

Bremen S-Bahn services  Bremerhaven-Lehe - Osterholz-Scharmbeck - Bremen - Twistringen

References

Railway stations in Bremen (state)
Bremen S-Bahn